Yuri Alberto Monteiro da Silva (born 18 March 2001), known as Yuri Alberto, is a Brazilian footballer who plays as a forward for Corinthians.

Club career

Santos

Born in the northern neighbourhood of Vila Cristina in São José dos Campos, Yuri Alberto joined Santos' youth setup in 2013 at the age of twelve. On 28 July 2017, he signed his first professional contract after agreeing to a signed a three-year deal.

On 1 November 2017, Yuri Alberto was promoted to the main squad by interim manager Elano. He made his first team – and Série A – debut fifteen days later, coming on as a substitute for Renato in a 3–1 away loss against Bahia.

Yuri Alberto scored his first goal for the club on 7 March 2018, netting the equalizer in a 2–1 Campeonato Paulista away loss against Grêmio Novorizontino; aged 16 years, 11 months and 20 days, he became the sixth youngest to score for Peixe in their history. He made his Copa Libertadores debut on 24 May, replacing Vitor Bueno in a 0–0 home draw against Real Garcilaso.

After featuring sparingly during the 2018 campaign, Yuri Alberto only managed to appear twice under Jorge Sampaoli in 2019. In March 2020, he returned to the first team under new manager Jesualdo Ferreira, but still rejected a contract renewal from the club and opted to leave in July.

Internacional
On 16 July 2020, it was announced that Yuri Alberto agreed to a five-year contract with fellow top-tier side Internacional, effective as of 1 August. This led to a conflict with Santos, as the club claimed a clause in Yuri Alberto's contract granted them priority for the renewal. Shortly after the announcement in the media, Internacional released an official statement regretting the "leak" of the offer.

On 3 August 2020, after releasing a note two days earlier stating that the club "wished him success on his career playing for Santos", Internacional announced the signing of Yuri Alberto on a five-year deal. The following 20 January, he scored a second-half hat-trick and made an assist in a 5–1 away routing of São Paulo, taking his tally up to ten league goals in only 16 matches. On 8 August 2021, he scored his second hat-trick for Internacional in a 4–0 away win over the Flamengo, reaching his fourth goal in the Série A season.

Zenit Saint Petersburg
On 30 January 2022, Yuri Alberto signed a five-year deal with Russian Premier League club FC Zenit Saint Petersburg.

Corinthians

On 29 June 2022, Zenit announced an agreement with Corinthians under which Yuri Alberto would move to Corinthians on loan, and Ivan and Gustavo Mantuan would move on loan in the opposite direction.

In January 2023, signed a permanent five year deal with the Brazilian club, the transfer seeing Robert Renan and Du Queiroz moving in the opposite direction.

International career
On 16 February 2017, Yuri Alberto was called up to Brazil under-17s for the year's South American Under-17 Football Championship. He also featured in the Montaigu Tournament and in the FIFA U-17 World Cup.

On 7 March 2018, Yuri Alberto and Santos teammate Rodrygo were called up to the under-20s, but both were cut from the squad six days later after a request from his club's president.

Honours

Club
Zenit Saint Petersburg
Russian Premier League: 2021–22

Career statistics

References

External links

2001 births
Living people
Footballers from São Paulo (state)
Brazilian footballers
Association football forwards
Campeonato Brasileiro Série A players
Russian Premier League players
Brazil youth international footballers
Santos FC players
Sport Club Internacional players
FC Zenit Saint Petersburg players
Sport Club Corinthians Paulista players
Brazilian expatriate footballers
Brazilian expatriate sportspeople in Russia
Expatriate footballers in Russia